Moyon Naga may refer to:
 Moyon Naga people (Moyon Nagas) - Moyon people
 Moyon Naga language - Moyon language